Joseph Thomas Anderson (born June 19, 1998) is an American professional ice hockey forward for the  Chicago Blackhawks of the National Hockey League (NHL).

Playing career
On April 3, 2014, Anderson committed to play for the USA Hockey National Team Development Program coming out of Hill-Murray School with 50 points that season.

After graduating from Ann Arbor Pioneer High School, Anderson was drafted by the New Jersey Devils in the third round of the 2016 NHL Entry Draft. After the draft, he decided to stay with Minnesota–Duluth Bulldogs of the National Collegiate Hockey Conference (NCHC). In his rookie season with the Bulldogs, Anderson played in the 2017 NCHC Frozen Faceoff championship game where he scored the game-winning goal to help the Bulldogs capture their first title over the University of North Dakota. For his efforts, he was named to the NCHC All-Rookie Team and to the NCAA West Region All-Tournament Team. The following season, Anderson won the 2018 NCAA Tournament championships with the Bulldogs.

On April 15, 2018, Anderson signed a three-year, entry-level contract with the Devils. After appearing in eight games for the Binghamton Devils of the American Hockey League (AHL), Anderson earned his first call up to the NHL, and made his NHL debut on October 27, 2018, in a 3–2 win over the Florida Panthers. On November 15, Anderson recorded his first career NHL goal in a 3–0 win over the Philadelphia Flyers.

As an impending restricted free agent with the Devils, on October 10, 2020, Anderson was traded to the Toronto Maple Leafs in exchange for Andreas Johnsson. On October 30, 2020, he signed a three year contract with his new team for an annual average value of $750,000. In 2021–22, Anderson led the Toronto Marlies in goals with twenty-six scored in fifty-six games.

During the 2022–23 season, Anderson made 14 appearances with the Maple Leafs in registering 3 points, however was unable to solidify a forward role on the team and was subject to waivers on multiple occasions. On re-assignment to the Marlies, Anderson as an alternate captain posted 27 points in 30 games. On February 27, 2023, Anderson was traded by the Maple Leafs, along with Pavel Gogolev and two future first and second-round draft selections to the Chicago Blackhawks in exchange for Jake McCabe, Sam Lafferty and two future conditional picks.

International play
Anderson competed for Team USA at the 2017 World Junior Ice Hockey Championships where he helped them win a gold medal. By doing so, Anderson became the first Bulldog to win a gold medal at the World Junior Ice Hockey Championships.

The following year, Anderson was named the captain of Team USA for the 2018 World Junior Ice Hockey Championships. That year he played alongside his younger brother Mikey to guide the team to a bronze medal.

Personal life
Anderson's younger brother, Mikey, was drafted 103rd overall by the Los Angeles Kings in the 2017 NHL Entry Draft, while his sister, Sami, played hockey for the College of St. Scholastica. His father, Gerry, also played hockey for College of St. Scholastica and his grandfather played for Minnesota–Duluth Bulldogs. His mother, Dana, was a professional racquetball player. Joey married Sami Schneider on July 9, 2022 in St. Paul, Minnesota.

Career statistics

Regular season and playoffs

International

Awards and honors

References

External links
 

1998 births
Living people
American men's ice hockey right wingers
Binghamton Devils players
Chicago Blackhawks players
Ice hockey players from Minnesota
Minnesota Duluth Bulldogs men's ice hockey players
New Jersey Devils draft picks
New Jersey Devils players
Toronto Maple Leafs players
Toronto Marlies players
USA Hockey National Team Development Program players